Dash 10 (or AN/ALQ-101) is an electronic countermeasures (ECM) pod used on aircraft such as the Blackburn Buccaneer at RAF Honington. It was also used in the Falklands War by the Avro Vulcan bomber during Operation Black Buck.

Functionality
Carried externally on a pylon under the wing of the attacking aircraft, the Dash 10 pod is used to counter radar guided weapons. It operates by manipulating the radar signals transmitted from such weapon systems and re-broadcasting them back to the sender in a convincing but highly deceptive manner. The intention is to trick the enemy air-defence system into aiming at an imaginary target which is located some miles distant from the aircraft fitted with the Dash 10 pod. Because enemy air defence systems appear to work normally whilst the Dash 10 pod is operating, the enemy personnel monitoring them do not realise that they are being deceived.

Electronic countermeasures
Military equipment of the United Kingdom